Khanqah is a building for Sufi spiritual retreats.

Khanqah or Khaneqah or Khaneqa or Khangah or Khaneqeh or Khanaqah, also rendered as Khanegah and Khanakakh, may also refer to:

Afghanistan
Khaneqah, Afghanistan

Azerbaijan
Xanəgah (disambiguation)

India
Khanqah-e-Moula, Srinagar, Jammu and Kashmir

Iran
Khaneqah, Ardabil
Khaneqah-e Bafrajerd, Ardabil Province
Khaneqah-e Gilavan, Ardabil Province
Khaneqah-e Olya, Ardabil
Khaneqah-e Sadat, Ardabil Province
Khaneqah-e Sofla, Ardabil
Khaneqah, Azarshahr, East Azerbaijan Province
Khaneqah, Heris, East Azerbaijan Province
Khaneqah, Khoda Afarin, East Azerbaijan Province
Khaneqah, Maragheh, East Azerbaijan Province
Khanqah, Mianeh, East Azerbaijan Province
Khaneqah Kandi, East Azerbaijan Province
Khaneqah Kolahi, East Azerbaijan Province
Khaneqah-e Sofla, East Azerbaijan, East Azerbaijan Province
Khaneqah Bala va Pain, Gilan Province
Khaneqah Bar, Gilan Province
Khaneqah, Kermanshah
Khaneqah-e Olya, Kermanshah
Khaneqah-e Sofla, Kermanshah
Khaneqah-e Vosta, Kermanshah Province
Khaneqah-e Gelin, Kurdistan Province
Khaneqah-e Hasan Gavgir, Kurdistan Province
Khaneqah Juju, Kurdistan Province
Khaneqah-e Razab, Kurdistan Province
Khaneqah-e Sheykh, Kurdistan Province
Khanqah, Lorestan
Khaneqah, Markazi
Khaneqah, Bardaskan, Razavi Khorasan Province
Khaneqah, Fariman, Razavi Khorasan Province
Khanegah, West Azerbaijan
Khaneqah, Bukan, West Azerbaijan Province
Khaneqah, Chaypareh, West Azerbaijan Province
Khaneqah, Khoy, West Azerbaijan Province
Khaneqah, Mahabad, West Azerbaijan Province
Khanaqah, Salmas, West Azerbaijan Province
Khaneqah, Urmia, West Azerbaijan Province
Khanqah-e Alvaj, West Azerbaijan Province
Khaneqah Sorkh, West Azerbaijan Province
Khanqah, Zanjan
Khaneqah-e Olya (disambiguation)
Khaneqah-e Sofla (disambiguation)